Wuchale (Amharic: ውጫሌ), also spelled Uccialli, is a town in northern Ethiopia. It is the largest settlement in Ambassel woreda and is located along Ethiopian Highway 2.

History 
In 1889, when it was a fief of Queen Taytu, Italian ambassador Count Pietro Antonelli met with Emperor Menelik II at Wuchale shortly after the death in battle of Emperor Yohannes IV. The two countries came to an agreement known as the Treaty of Wuchale, which was signed on 2 May. In this treaty, emperor Menelik recognized Italy's occupation of Eritrea and agreed (at least in the Italian version) Italian trusteeship over the Abyssinian empire under Menelik.

Writing a few years later, Augustus B. Wylde described the Wuchale market, held on Mondays, as a small one.

The Tigrayan People's Liberation Front and Ethiopian People's Democratic Movement reported that they had killed 703 government troops and captured 168 in fighting at Wuchale on 29–30 January 1990. However, the Derg announced on 2 February that their troops had retaken the town.

Demographics 
Based on figures from the Central Statistical Agency in 2005, Wuchale has an estimated total population of 6,811 of whom 3,326 are men and 3,485 are women. The 1994 census reported this town had a total population of 3,934 of whom 1,750 were men and 2,184 were women.

Notes 

Populated places in the Amhara Region